The Bornean yellow muntjac (Muntiacus atherodes) is a muntjac species endemic to the moist forests of Borneo.

Taxonomy
It lives alongside the common muntjac. It is similar to its much more common cousin and was only recognised as a separate species in 1982.

Description
Apart from the color difference, its antlers, which are just  in length, are smaller than those of the common muntjac. It has not been extensively studied and has been described as a relict species.

Ecology
This muntjac species is a potential prey of the Bornean tiger.

References

Muntjac
Mammals of Indonesia
Mammals of Malaysia
Mammals of Borneo
Mammals described in 1982
Borneo lowland rain forests
Endemic fauna of Borneo